Sulhamstead Lock is a lock on the River Kennet to the east of Sulhamstead in the English county of Berkshire.

Sulhamstead Lock was built between 1718 and 1723 under the supervision of the engineer John Hore of Newbury, and this stretch of the river is now administered by the Canal & River Trust as part of the Kennet Navigation.

The lock was rebuilt in 1966 by a collaboration involving staff from British Waterways and volunteer labour.

References

See also

Locks on the Kennet and Avon Canal

Locks of Berkshire
West Berkshire District
Locks on the Kennet and Avon Canal
Sulhamstead